West 9th Street Commercial Historic District is a national historic district located at Wilmington, New Castle County, Delaware. It encompasses 28 contributing buildings in a commercial area of Wilmington developed in the early 20th century.  The district includes representative examples of the Italianate and Colonial Revival styles

It was added to the National Register of Historic Places in 2008.

Education
Residents are in the Christina School District. They are zoned to Stubbs Early Childhood Center (K-5), Bayard School (for grades 6–8), and Christiana High School.

References

Commercial buildings on the National Register of Historic Places in Delaware
Italianate architecture in Delaware
Colonial Revival architecture in Delaware
Historic districts in Wilmington, Delaware
Historic districts on the National Register of Historic Places in Delaware
National Register of Historic Places in Wilmington, Delaware